A vice-county (vice county or biological vice-county) is a geographical division of the British Isles used for the purposes of biological recording and other scientific data-gathering. It is sometimes called a Watsonian vice-county as vice-counties were introduced for Great Britain, its offshore islands, and the Isle of Man, by Hewett Cottrell Watson who first used them in the third volume of his Cybele Britannica published in 1852. Watson's vice-counties were based on the ancient counties of Britain, but often subdividing these boundaries to create smaller, more uniform units, and considering exclaves to be part of the surrounding vice-county.

In 1901 Robert Lloyd Praeger introduced a similar system for Ireland and its off-shore islands.

Vice-counties are the "standard geographical area for county based [...] recording". They provide a stable basis for recording using similarly sized units, and, although National Grid-based reporting has grown in popularity, vice-counties remain a useful mapping boundary, employed in many regional surveys, especially county floras and national lists. This allows data collected over long periods of time to be compared easily. The vice-counties remain unchanged by subsequent local government reorganisations, allowing historical and modern data to be more accurately compared.

In 2002, to mark the 150th anniversary of the introduction of the Watsonian vice-county system, the NBN Trust commissioned the digitisation of the 112 vice-county boundaries for England, Scotland and Wales, based on 420 original one-inch to the mile maps annotated by Dandy in 1947, and held at the Natural History Museum, London. The resulting datafiles were much more detailed than anything readily available to recorders up to that point, and were made freely available (as a beta version). Intended for use with modern GIS and biological recording software, a final 'standard' version was released in 2008. Up until that point, county recorders only had general access to a set of two fold-out vice-county maps covering the entirety of Great Britain, published in 1969.

Vice-county systems

The vice-county system was first introduced by Hewett Cottrell Watson in the third volume of his Cybele Britannica published in 1852. He refined the system in later volumes. The geographical area that Watson called "Britain" consisted of the island of Great Britain with all of its offshore islands, plus the Isle of Man, but excluding the Channel Islands. This area was divided into 112 vice-counties with larger counties divided; for example, Devon into the vice-counties of North Devon and South Devon, and Yorkshire into five vice-counties. Each of these 112 vice-counties has a name and a number. Thus Vice-county 38, often abbreviated to "VC38", is called "Warwickshire".

In 1901, Robert Lloyd Praeger extended the system of vice-counties to Ireland and its off-shore islands, based on an earlier suggestion by C. C. Babington in 1859. The Irish vice-counties were based on the historic 32 counties of Ireland, with the six largest being sub-divided; for example, the county of Cork was divided into three vice-counties. This produced a total of 40 vice-counties for Ireland, which were numbered from H1 to H40 ("H" for "Hibernia"). As with the 112 vice-counties of Britain, each vice-county has a name as well as a number. Thus Vice-county (or VC) H3 is "West Cork".

Combining these two systems produces a 152 vice-county system. The exclusion of the Channel Islands from Watson's system for Britain has led to variations between different recording schemes. The geographical area covered by the 152 vice-counties may be described as the "British Isles", as in the 2008 Checklist of Beetles of the British Isles. Other recording schemes regard the "British Isles" as including the Channel Islands. As they are not part of the 152 vice-county system, the Channel Islands may be added as an extra vice-county, making 153 in total, being indicated by letter codes such as "C" or "CI". Less usually, each of the five separate islands may be treated as a vice-county, giving 157 vice-counties in total.

Alternative counts of vice-counties used in different recording schemes are shown in the table below.

The vice-counties of Britain alone may be described as "Watsonian vice-counties", or this term may be used for the combined vice-counties of Britain and Ireland, which may also be described as "Watson-Praeger vice-counties". In all cases, the Channel Islands may be excluded or included, so that the count of vice-counties varies, as noted in the table above.

List of vice-counties

Vice-counties of Ireland listed by county, province and jurisdiction
Praeger's fieldwork mostly predates and ignores the county boundary changes made in 1899 under the Local Government (Ireland) Act 1898. Divergences from the pre-1899 boundaries are noted below.

See also
Subdivisions of England
Subdivisions of Scotland
Subdivisions of Wales
Subdivisions of Northern Ireland
Counties of Ireland

Notes

References

External links
Vice-county map from the British Bryological Society
OS grid reference to vice-county conversion utility
Digital download page for Watsonian Vice-County Boundaries
NBN Metadata on Watsonian Vice-county digitisation
BSBI Vice-County Census Catalogue

Natural history of the United Kingdom
Natural history of Ireland
Counties of the United Kingdom
Counties of Ireland